Michael Robert Booker (born 16 April 1937) is a British former figure skater who competed in men's singles. He is a three-time European medalist (silver in 1955 and 1956, bronze in 1957) and a six-time British national champion. Booker placed sixth at the 1956 Winter Olympics and fifth at the 1956 World Championships.

Results

References

British male single skaters
Figure skaters at the 1956 Winter Olympics
Olympic figure skaters of Great Britain
1937 births
Living people
European Figure Skating Championships medalists
People from Islington (district)